Stage Blood is a comedy by Charles Ludlam, a spoof in which events taking place in the life of a third-rate theater company, touring  Shakespeare's Hamlet, loosely mirror the plot of Hamlet itself.  The cast was headed by Ridiculous Theatrical Company veterans Black-Eyed Susan, Lola Pashalinski, Bill Vehr, Jack Mallory, John D. Brockmeyer and Ludlam himself, who played the dual roles of actor Carleton Stone Jr. and Hamlet.  It opened off-Broadway at the Evergreen Theatre on December 8, 1974, where it played 45 performances.  It was revived at the Truck and Warehouse Theatre on July 1, 1977, and again at the Charles Ludlam Theatre (formerly One Sheridan Square) on May 24, 1978.

References

Plays by Charles Ludlam